Tomyris (minor planet designation: 590 Tomyris) is a minor planet orbiting the Sun. Its name derives from the Massagetean (ancient Eastern Iranian) ruler Tomyris, and may have been inspired by the asteroid's provisional designation 1906 TO.

References

External links
 
 

Eos asteroids
Tomyris
Tomyris
19060304